2023 was the 61st edition of  (MGP), the annual Norwegian music competition that serves as the country's preselection for the Eurovision Song Contest. It was organised by Norway's public broadcaster NRK, and consisted of three semi-finals and a final, held throughout January and February 2023. The winner of the competition, Alessandra with "Queen of Kings", is set to represent  in the Eurovision Song Contest 2023 in Liverpool, United Kingdom.

Format 
The contest consisted of three semi-finals at Screen Studios in Nydalen, and a final at Trondheim Spektrum. From 2020 to 2022, a number of artists were formerly pre-qualified for the final, but this was longer be the case in 2023. Moreover, there were no duels nor a "last chance" round, and voting began once all of the artists have performed. A total of 21 entries competed, with seven songs for each semi-final. The three performers who obtain the most votes qualified for the final. In addition, the international jury was re-introduced in the final, consisting of industry professionals from multiple countries. The jury and the public each contributed 50% to the final result.

Competing entries 
About one month after the Eurovision Song Contest 2022, NRK officially opened submissions for songwriters to submit entries for Melodi Grand Prix 2023. The submission window closed on 18 September 2022.

The competition is open to all songwriters, and each songwriter can submit up to three songs. Each song should have at least one Norwegian contributor, in order to "prioritise and promote the Norwegian music scene". In addition to the open submission, NRK also looked for possible entries through targeted search and direct dialogue with the Norwegian music industry, and through songwriting camps held in August 2022.

In October 2022, it was announced that 21 entries were selected to take part in the contest. The competing artists were announced on 4 January, with the respective entries to be released on a weekly basis, starting from 9 January. Among the competing artists are Kate Gulbrandsen, Stig van Eijk, Jowst and Ulrikke Brandstorp, winners of Melodi Grand Prix in 1987, 1999, 2017 and 2020, respectively.

Semi-finals

Semi-final 1 
The first semi-final took place on 14 January 2023.

Semi-final 2 
The second semi-final took place on 21 January 2023.

Semi-final 3 
The third semi-final took place on 28 January 2023.

Final 
The final took place on 4 February 2023. The winner was selected by a 50/50 combination of public televoting and ten international juries. In addition to the competing entries, Subwoolfer, who represented Norway in the Eurovision Song Contest 2022, also performed as an interval act.

Ratings

See also 
 Norway in the Eurovision Song Contest
 Eurovision Song Contest 2023

References

External links 

 Melodi Grand Prix on NRK TV 

2023
2023 song contests
Eurovision Song Contest 2023